Bouchet may refer to:

People 
 André du Bouchet (1924–2001), 20th century French poet
 Barbara Bouchet (born 1940s), American actress
 Christian Bouchet (born 1955), French journalist and politician
 Christophe Bouchet (born 1962), French journalist
 Christophe Bouchut (born 1966), French race car driver whose name is sometimes spelled Christophe Bouchet
 Claire Bouchet (born 1954), French politician
 Edward Bouchet (1852–1918), American physicist
 Paule du Bouchet (born 1951), French writer and novelist, daughter of André du Bouchet
 Philippe Bouchet (born 1953), French zoologist
 Sylvie Bouchet Bellecourt (born 1957), French politician

Places 
 Bouchet lake, in Haute-Loire, France
 Bouchet, Drôme, a commune in the Drôme department, in southeastern France

Wine 
 Alternative name for Cabernet Sauvignon in the Gironde region of France
 Alternative name for Cabernet Franc in the St-Emilion and Pomerol region of France